Buk Góralski  is a village in the administrative district of Gmina Jabłonowo Pomorskie, within Brodnica County, Kuyavian-Pomeranian Voivodeship, in north-central Poland.

Massacre during Second World War

During the German Invasion of Poland in 1939, German forces on 21 September together with Selbstschutz murdered 12 people in the village.

References

Villages in Brodnica County
Massacres in Poland
Germany–Poland relations
Nazi war crimes in Poland